Brian LaVell "Skip" Hicks (born October 13, 1974) is a former American football running back in the National Football League. In his four seasons, Hicks played for the Washington Redskins and the Tennessee Titans.  He played college football at the University of California, Los Angeles and still holds school records for touchdowns in a season, with 26 in 1997, and career touchdowns, with 55 (1993–94, 96-97).  He graduated from Burkburnett High School in Burkburnett, Texas in 1993.

Hicks also played for the Toronto Argonauts of the Canadian Football League in 2004, appearing in two games.  The Argonauts went on to win the 92nd Grey Cup that year, but Hicks was not dressed for that game.

Post-playing career
In 2014, it was announced Hicks would serve as an assistant football coach at Oaks Christian School in California.

References

1974 births
Living people
People from Corsicana, Texas
American football running backs
UCLA Bruins football players
Tennessee Titans players
Washington Redskins players
Toronto Argonauts players
Canadian football running backs
African-American players of Canadian football
Frankfurt Galaxy players
21st-century African-American sportspeople
20th-century African-American sportspeople